Pequeno or Pequeño is a Portuguese surname, a nickname for a small person, from Portuguese pequeno, Spanish pequeño "small". Notable people with the surname include:
 Gué Pequeno (1980), Italian rapper and record producer
 Nilton Pequeno (1998), Santomean footballer
 Paula Pequeno (1976), Brazilian volleyball player
 Vavá Pequeno (1994), São Toméan footballer
 Walisson Pequeno (1999), Brazilian retired footballer

Portuguese-language surnames
Surnames from nicknames